Nerea Garmendia Martínez (born 29 October 1979) is a Spanish actress and television presenter who has developed her career in theater and television.

Biography 
Born in the Gipuzkoan town of Beasain, she always knew she wanted to be an actress and at the age of 16 she decided to tell her parents and get down to work.

She studied at La Salle school, at the age of 10 she moved to San Sebastian where she lived until she moved to Madrid to study at the Cristina Rota School of Dramatic Art and at Alicia Hermida's La Barraca.

Nerea began to become famous among the Basque public with the ETB2 program Vaya Semanita where she was one of the protagonists. The program was presented by Óscar Terol and was so famous that TVE1 decided to launch it at a national level with Made In China. Of course the program kept all its actors, including Nerea herself. Unfortunately it was not very successful and was soon withdrawn from the grid.

Previously she collaborated in other television programs such as El Rey de la casa (TV Valenciana) and Easy Peasy (in the Basque autonomous ETB), in the series Hasiberriak (ETB1) and La noche... con Fuentes y Cía (Telecinco). She also presented the daily live show KTM and was Sara Montiel's crazy waitress in Marvellous, the international campaign for MTV's European Music Awards, and in several short films, including Portal mortal.

But most of the Spanish public remembers her for playing the role of Ruth, the psychologist of the San Antonio police station in the TV series Los hombres de Paco. Nerea joined the series in 2006 and ended her character in July 2007, after it was discovered that her character was the evil mole of the police station and bad guy of the season. She remained in the series for 3 seasons. During that time she combined her work in the series with her debut on the stage with the play Nunca es fácil where she shared the lead role with Nancho Novo (2006-2007), the play premiered at the Teatro Príncipe de Gran Vía in Madrid and was performed for a year.

In 2007-08 she had the opportunity to collaborate on two film projects, L.A.: Fear and Welcome Papra.

In 2009 she worked as the futuristic-looking Presenter 3.0 for the Antena3 network, which she combined with her role as Silvia Comas in the Antena3 series 90-60-90, diario secreto de una adolescente where she formed a love triangle with Jesús Olmedo and Esmeralda Moya.

In 2010 she traveled to Colombia to record La Reina del Sur a co-production of Antena 3 and Telemundo, which was a huge success in the U.S., Mexico and South America. Upon her return she returned to the theater with 19:30 a play about political corruption with which she toured for a year (2010-2011) where she shared the stage with colleagues such as: Fernando Cayo, Ana Wagener, Roberto Enríquez, Adolfo Fernández, Sonia Almarcha and Antonio Molero.

In 2011 she participated in the sitcom Los Quién (Antena 3). In 2012 she debuted as a monologuist in Gente Seria (ETB). Also in this year she made a cameo in the Antena3 series Fenómenos.

In 2013 she participated in the Antena 3, program Splash! Famosos al agua. She was a semi-finalist, 8th out of 28 contestants who participated. She was the first woman to dive from 10 meters, the only contestant to dive from 10 meters in all her jumps, both individual and synchronized, and came in first place in the two of the three elimination galas in which she participated. That same year she returned to the stage with the comedy Tres by Juan Carlos Rubio, along with Vanesa Romero.

That same year she also participated in the videoclip of the song  "Huelo el miedo" of the Power metal band Warcry.

In March 2015, she began presenting in prime time on La 1 the variety show La Alfombra Roja Palace alongside  Jota Abril and Berta Collado. As she herself later argued, she left the show to focus on other projects. Thus, Garmendia only presented one gala of the Spanish TV show.

In May 2015, she took the stage of Teatro Alfil to play the role of Ajo, in the romantic comedy Te elegiría otra vez, written and directed by Sara Escudero, and in the same year she also premiered the play Espacio by director David Marqués.

In September 2016, it was announced that she joined the filming of the third season of the Antena 3 series Allí Abajo.

In February 2021, together with Víctor Amilibia, she launches a new comedy show entitled Vaya Pack de Vascos in monologue format.

Filmography

Short films

Television series

Television programs

Theater 

 19:30 (2010), by Adolfo Fernández and Ramón Ibarra.
 Nunca es fácil (2006-2007), by Nancho Novo.
 El tomatazo (2001)
 Emociones abstractas (1998), by Lourdes Villagrán.
 Tres, Juan Carlos Rubio. (2013)
 Némesis, Guillermo Lanza. (2011)
 Te elegiría otra vez, Sara Escudero. (2015)
 Espacio (2015), de David Marqués
 Todo sobre Vázquez (2016) by Jaime Palacios
 Redford & Newman. Dos hombres sin destino (2019) by Ángel Martín alongside Miki Nadal and Sinacio
 El club de los tarados (2019) monólogos inclusivos.
 Vaya Pack de Vascos (2021) monólogos junto a Víctor Amilibia.

Private life 
From 2008 to 2020 she was romantically involved with the Sevillian actor Jesús Olmedo.

References

External links 
 Nerea Garmendia on IMDb

Actresses from the Basque Country (autonomous community)
People from Beasain
Spanish television actresses
Spanish film actresses
Spanish women comedians
Living people
1979 births